The Aircraft Engineering Corp Ace K-1 was a United States single-seat biplane aircraft designed in 1918 by Alexander Klemin, then Professor of Aeronautical Engineering at New York University (NYU). It was the first American civil aircraft to be produced after World War I. Later versions included a nearly faired-in engine installation. Re-introduced in 1930 with a re-designed fuselage and strengthened structure as the Ace 300 and Ace 200, fitted with Salmson 9Ad and LeBlond 5D engines respectively.

One example survives, powered by a  Keane Acemotor and displayed at the Cradle of Aviation Museum in Garden City, New York.

Variants
Ace K-1Early production aircraft powered by Ford Model T engines.
Ace 200Later production aircraft powered by a LeBlond 5D engine.
Ace 300Later production aircraft powered by a Salmson 9Ad engine.

Specifications (K-1)

References

Further reading

External links

 aerofiles.com

Single-engined tractor aircraft
Biplanes
1910s United States civil utility aircraft
Keane aircraft
Aircraft first flown in 1919